Kathryn Clarke (1873 – August 19, 1940) was the first woman to serve in the Oregon Senate.

Biography
Clarke was born in 1873 to John Clarke and Catherine McGregor Clarke in Gardiner, Oregon. In January 1915, Senator George Neuner Jr. resigned to serve as district attorney, so governor Oswald West, the cousin of Clarke, set to appoint a replacement. He initially offered the post to Dexter Rice, a judge, but Rice declined. A special election was held on January 20, which Clarke won by 76 votes. Clarke served until January 1917.

See also
 Marian B. Towne, first woman to serve in the Oregon House of Representatives

References

1873 births
1940 deaths
People from Gardiner, Oregon
People from Pasadena, California
Republican Party Oregon state senators
Women state legislators in Oregon
20th-century American politicians
20th-century American women politicians